SkyQuest or Skyquest can refer to:

Companies
SkyQuest (aircraft), a variant of the SlipStream Genesis aircraft
SkyQuest (ride), a people mover by US Thrill Rides